Laurance R. Doyle (born 1953) is an American scientist who received his Ph.D. from the Ruprecht Karl University of Heidelberg.

Doyle has worked at the SETI Institute since 1987 where he is a principal investigator and astrophysicist. His main area of study has been the formation and detection of extrasolar planets, but he has also worked on communications theory. In particular he has written on how patterns in animal communication relate to humans with an emphasis on cetaceans.

Early life
Doyle grew up on a dairy farm in Cambria, California and therefore, didn't have much access to information about stars. But by reading books at the local library, Doyle was able to develop his knowledge in astronomy, and eventually obtain his Bachelor's and Master's of Science degrees in astronomy from San Diego State University.

Career
His first job was at the Jet Propulsion Laboratory as an imaging engineer, where he was in charge of analyzing pictures of Jupiter and Saturn sent from the spacecraft Voyager. He moved to Heidelberg, Germany, to help analyze images of Halley's Comet. He got his doctorate in Astrophysics at the University of Heidelberg.

Doyle is currently seeking to compare dolphin whistles and baby babble in an attempt to make predictions about extraterrestrial communications. He believes that by measuring the complexity of communications for different species on Earth, we could get a good indication of how advanced an extraterrestrial signal is using an application of Zipf's law. His study determined that babies babble over 800 different sounds with the same amount of frequency as dolphins. As they grow older, those sounds decrease to around 50 and become more repetitious. The study found that baby dolphins develop similarly in regards to their whistling.

Doyle is faculty at Principia College and the founding Director of Principia College's Institute for the Metaphysics of Physics, founded in 2014.

In popular culture
In May 2005, he appeared on a National Geographic Channel special titled  Extraterrestrial. In 2012, he appeared in the episode "Will We Survive First Contact," of The Science Channel series Through the Wormhole narrated by Morgan Freeman.

References

External links 

NASA workshop

Essay by him on Space.com about whales
SETI Profile
Profile of the Drake equation led by Doyle
Wired article

American astronomers
American Christian Scientists
Search for extraterrestrial intelligence
Heidelberg University alumni
San Diego State University alumni
Living people
1953 births
Principia College faculty